Milton House may refer to:

in Australia
Milton House (Melbourne), Victoria
Milton House, Milton, in Milton, Queensland

in the United States
Milton House (Denver, Colorado) in Potter Highlands Historic District, a Denver Landmark, designed by Glen Huntington
Milton Town House, Milton, New Hampshire, listed on the National Register of Historic Places (NRHP)
Milton Hall, Washington, D.C., NRHP-listed
Milton House (Milton, Wisconsin), NRHP-listed

See also
Milton Historic District (disambiguation)
Milton Center Historic District, Milton, Connecticut, NRHP-listed
Milton Centre Historic District, Milton, Massachusetts, NRHP-listed
Milton College Historic District, Milton, Wisconsin, NRHP-listed in Rock County
Milton Hill Historic District, Milton, Massachusetts, NRHP-listed